The Stark Candy Company, originally the Howard B. Stark Company, was a candy manufacturer founded in 1939, in Milwaukee, Wisconsin. It was a competitor to Necco and manufactured products including candy hearts, candy raisins, Mary Janes, peanut butter kisses, salt water taffy, and candy cigarettes.

Stark moved from Milwaukee to Pewaukee in 1960. In 1988, it was purchased by Necco. In 2008, Necco announced the Stark plant would close. Candy raisins were discontinued after the company was purchased by Necco, sparking a consumer backlash.

References 

 
Confectionery companies of the United States
Companies based in Wisconsin
American companies established in 1939
Food and drink companies established in 1939
1939 establishments in Wisconsin
2008 disestablishments in Wisconsin
Food and drink companies disestablished in 2008
1988 mergers and acquisitions